Hadi Das (1772-1837), was an Odia Hindu devotee of Odisha in the early 18th century.

Early life 
Hadi Das, a saint from Odisha, was born at Champapur just one km from Chhatia in the state of Odisha in 1772 A.D. to the parents Chemei Ojha and Devaki of a Kamar (blacksmith) family. His parent had lost all the children before Hadi Das was born. For this reason his parent out of love and affection named the child as "Hadi" (a low caste). Actually his real name was Hadi Das (the servant of vishnu).

A Spiritual Teacher 
His spiritual teacher was Mastaram Das, a saint from western India residing at Puri at that time. Hadi Das came in contact with him and was inspired  by him for his spiritual and divine power and admitted him as his spiritual teacher. Hadi Das chose for his ancestral occupation a place at Chhatia called Kalagiri surrounded by trees and bushes. The Bata or the tree under which he was working is said to be still preserved as a symbol.

Literary works 
The future prophecies, the past and the present activity of the people, the truth of spiritual doctrines are displayed through his countless Bhajanas, Malika and other spiritual texts like "Sankhanavi" "Ananta Gupta Gita", "Anantagoi", "Bhabananabara", "Hanumanta Gita", "Nila Madhava Gita" etc. His contributions and literary achievements have been appreciated in a thesis "Hadi Das Rachanabali" by a local educationalist Prof. R. Sahu.

After Hadi Das breathed his last in the late 1830 he was regarded as a saint of Orissa like Panchasakha. He was popularly known as twelfth incarnation of Mahapurusa  Achutananda  Das a great saint of Nemalabata.

References

1772 births
1837 deaths
Hindu poets
People from Jajpur district